Denzel Edwin "Denny" Crum (born March 2, 1937) is an American former men's college basketball coach at the University of Louisville from 1971 to 2001, compiling a  record. He guided the Cardinals to two NCAA championships (1980, 1986) and six Final Fours. Honored in the Naismith Memorial Basketball Hall of Fame since 1994, Crum is one of the major figures in the history of sports in Kentucky and in college basketball in general.

As the head coach at U of L, Crum is widely credited with pioneering the now-common strategy of scheduling tough non-conference match-ups early in the season in order to prepare his teams for March's NCAA tournament, where one defeat ends the season.  Crum's prolific post-season play and calm demeanor earned him the monikers "Mr. March" and his most well-known nickname, "Cool Hand Luke."

Playing career
Denzel Edwin Crum was born in San Fernando, California. From 1954 to 1956, Crum played basketball at Los Angeles Pierce College. In 1956, he transferred to UCLA to play for John Wooden.  While at UCLA, Crum was honored with the Irv Pohlmeyer Memorial Trophy for outstanding first-year varsity player.  He also received the Bruin Bench Award for most improved player the following year.

Coaching career
After graduating in 1958, Crum served as the freshman basketball coach at UCLA.  In 1961 he returned to Pierce College as an assistant coach and in 1964 became the head coach through the 1967 season.  Crum was then  rehired by Wooden as a top assistant coach and chief recruiter.  As a coach at UCLA, he played a role in three NCAA titles. He remained at UCLA until his departure for Louisville in 1971.

Louisville (1971–2001)
In 1971, Crum was hired as head coach by the University of Louisville, taking over from John Dromo.  Although there had been substantial national success under Bernard "Peck" Hickman, it was under Crum that the University of Louisville became a consistent college basketball power.  By 1972, Crum had taken his first team to the NCAA Final Four, where his team lost to John Wooden's UCLA team.  Crum would go on to lead the Louisville Cardinals to five more final fours (1975, 1980, 1982, 1983, and 1986).  He is tied for seventh all-time in number of final four appearances with Adolph Rupp. They rank behind John Wooden, Dean Smith, Mike Krzyzewski, Roy Williams, Tom Izzo and Rick Pitino.

On March 24, 1980, the Cardinals won the NCAA Tournament champions, defeating Crum's alma mater, UCLA, 59–54.  Crum's 1980 national champions have been credited with popularizing the High-5. Six years later, Louisville would overcome Duke 72–69 for a second title led by "Never Nervous" Pervis Ellison.  Crum is one of only 11 coaches to win multiple national championships.  In 30 seasons, Crum took the Cardinals to 23 NCAA tournaments, posting an overall record of 43–21.

While in the Metro Conference, the Cardinals won 12 regular season titles and 11 tournament championships.  In its 19 years seasons, Louisville finished 1st or 2nd 17 times.

In 1993, Crum became the second fastest coach to reach 500 wins.  He ranks 16th in overall Division I wins.

Other coaching
Crum coached the 1977 USA World University Team, where he won a gold medal. In 1987, he coached the Pan American team to a silver medal.

Coaching style
Crum had a signature style as a coach.  He usually held a rolled up program in one hand during games and would often gesture with it.  At Louisville, whose team colors are red and black, Crum sometimes wore a red blazer on the sidelines.

On the court, Crum's teams were famous for running a 2-2-1 zone press that switched in half court to man-to-man defense. Like his mentor at UCLA, John Wooden, Crum ran the high-post offense, which emphasizes post play. From 1989 to 1996, four of Crum's post players (Pervis Ellison, Felton Spencer, Clifford Rozier, and Samaki Walker) were selected in the top 16 picks in the NBA draft, including three (all but Rozier) in the top ten. Even Crum's guards tended to score on the interior: his 1980 national championship team was known as the "Doctors of Dunk." On defense, his players were expected to be interchangeable, switching on all picks, and fronted the pivot. This defense denied interior passes and encouraged perimeter shots. The year after Crum won his last national championship in 1986, the NCAA introduced the three-point line to post-season play, revolutionizing the game. With outside shooting newly emphasized, Crum never returned to the Final Four.

Throughout his career, Crum was famous for superior in-game coaching. His teams tended to score immediately out of timeouts—using plays Crum would draw up in the huddle—and play well in close games.

Retirement
On his 64th birthday, Crum announced that he would retire at the end of the season. Though Crum insisted the decision was his, it is widely rumored that Louisville athletic director Tom Jurich drove him out to pursue the newly available Rick Pitino.

Radio career
From 2004 to 2014, Crum co-hosted a local radio talk show with former University of Kentucky head coach Joe B. Hall. Both did their portions of the show from different studios, Crum in Louisville and Hall in Lexington. The Joe B. and Denny Show was the top Fox Sports radio show in the state of Kentucky. The show, which aired on WKRD in Louisville and WVLK-FM in Lexington, was carried by 21 stations in all at its peak, and still had 16 stations when it ended on October 30, 2014 after WVLK-FM announced a format change.

Honors
In the 1980s, Crum was named National Coach of the Year three times (1980, 1983, 1986).  He was awarded Metro Conference Coach of the year three times (1979, 1980, 1983).  In 1980, he was also named the Sporting News Coach of the Year, the Basketball Weekly Coach of the Year, and the Basketball Weekly Man of the Year.

In 1994 Crum was inducted into the Naismith Memorial Basketball Hall of Fame.

In 2002, Crum received the Legends of Coaching award given by the John R. Wooden Award Committee.  This award recognizes "a coach's character, success rate on the court, graduating rate of student athletes, [and] his coaching philosophy".

On February 7, 2007, Louisville's home floor at Freedom Hall was officially named "Denny Crum Court." When the Cardinals basketball teams moved to the downtown KFC Yum! Center in 2010, the name "Denny Crum Court" was retained in the new facility.

In 2010 Crum was an inaugural inductee of Pierce College's athletic hall of fame.

Personal life
Since 2001, Denny Crum has been married to Susan Sweeney Crum, then a news anchor and reporter for Louisville television station WDRB. In 2006, Susan Sweeney Crum became an announcer and news anchor at Louisville public radio station WFPL. He has three children, Cynthia and Steve from his first marriage, and Scott from his second marriage.  He lives in Louisville and has a hunting ranch in eastern Idaho, near Henrys Lake.

He also plays professional poker and collects western novels by Louis L'Amour. During his coaching career, he was amongst the founders of the Louisville Eccentric Observer, the city's alternative weekly newspaper.  For the past twenty years, Crum has also bred horses.

Crum still appears at various functions with former Cardinal and pro-basketball player Darrell Griffith.

Crum founded The Denny Crum Scholarship Foundation, Inc., which awards scholarships to individuals who have demonstrated leadership, community service, and academic achievement. Requirements include: application form, high school transcript, 3.0 cumulative GPA, and a community service resume listing detailed volunteer involvement and leadership experience.

Head coaching record

See also
 List of college men's basketball coaches with 600 wins
 List of NCAA Division I Men's Final Four appearances by coach

References

1937 births
Living people
American men's basketball players
Basketball coaches from California
Basketball players from California
College men's basketball head coaches in the United States
Guards (basketball)
Los Angeles Pierce Brahmas men's basketball players
Louisville Cardinals men's basketball coaches
Naismith Memorial Basketball Hall of Fame inductees
National Collegiate Basketball Hall of Fame inductees
People from San Fernando, California
Sportspeople from Los Angeles County, California
Sportspeople from Louisville, Kentucky
UCLA Bruins men's basketball coaches
UCLA Bruins men's basketball players
Basketball players from Louisville, Kentucky